Leather-leaf fern is a common name for several ferns and may refer to:

Polypodium scouleri, native to western North America
Pyrrosia eleagnifolia, native to New Zealand
Rumohra adiantiformis, widespread